Hnilec is a village and municipality in the Spišská Nová Ves District in the Košice Region of central-eastern Slovakia.

History
In historical records the village was first mentioned in 1290.

Geography
The village lies at an altitude of 669 metres and covers an area of 27.082 km².
In 2011 had a population of about 451 inhabitants.

Genealogical resources

The records for genealogical research are available at the state archive "Statny Archiv in Levoca, Slovakia"

 Roman Catholic church records (births/marriages/deaths): 1765-1912 (parish A)
 Lutheran church records (births/marriages/deaths): 1783-1896 (parish B)

See also
 List of municipalities and towns in Slovakia

External links
http://en.e-obce.sk/obec/hnilec/hnilec.html
https://web.archive.org/web/20071116010355/http://www.statistics.sk/mosmis/eng/run.html
http://www.hnilec.eu
Surnames of living people in Hnilec

Villages and municipalities in Spišská Nová Ves District